Mystic Records is an American record label and music production company specializing in hardcore punk, crossover thrash, underground music, vintage and cult records. It is owned and operated by Doug Moody. The label was first established in Hollywood, California, and subsequently moved its operations to Oceanside, California. Mystic Records is an independent label and is a member of the Recording Industry Association of America (RIAA).

History

Background
Mystic Records is closely associated with the personality of its founder, Doug Moody, regarded as a pioneer of the independent rock and roll industry. Moody's father, Walter Moody, was himself an influential figure in the music industry, running EMI Studios (Abbey Road Studios) in London during the 1930s. In 1953 the family moved to the United States.

Moody decided to himself become involved in the music business, first working in the A&R department of Silvertone Records in New Jersey. A series of music industry jobs followed throughout the decades of the 1960s and 1970s, including stints in various capacities at Kama Sutra Records, 20th Century Fox, and A&M Records.

Studio and label
Seeking another place in the music industry outside of the major record labels, Moody opened a recording studio in Hollywood, California, at the location of the old Mustang Studios, made famous as a facility used by the Bobby Fuller Four. Moody changed out the studio's superannuated 2 track mono recording gear and replaced it with state of the art 8-track stereo gear, leaving the recording rooms otherwise largely unaltered.

In tandem with the studio was launched the Mystic Records label. During the label's peak period of activity, from 1982 through 1990, Mystic released over 200 records, many of which were multi-band compilations, involving the work of several hundred artists. Emerging as a prominent force in the Southern California punk rock music scene, Mystic put out an array of alternative bands, with an emphasis on the hardcore punk, crossover thrash, and speed metal styles in vogue during this period.

Moody claimed to have invested $70,000 in the label in 1983 alone, but taking into account recording costs and sales figures averaging about 2,000 copies per record, found the operation with about $40,000 left to recover at the end of that year. Bands would purchase studio time, with Mystic recouping its investment against royalties due, which in 1984 Moody claimed was approximately 40 cents per record.

In conjunction with the label, Moody and Mystic established its own wholesale record distribution branch, MD Distributing. This distributorship handled not only Mystic releases but those of other labels as well.

Bands
Some of the best known artists on Mystic Records include NOFX, RKL, Battalion of Saints, Ill Repute, Agression, Newport Beach Dune Buggy Band and The Mentors. Mystic Records has also released vinyl compilations featuring Suicidal Tendencies, Love Canal, New Regime, Black Flag, False Alarm, Duct Tape Hostage, SIN 34, Government Issue, The Minutemen, Burning Image, Habeas Corpus, and Bad Religion.

Importance
Mystic Records has been credited with several innovations in the independent record industry of the 1980s. It introduced Super Sevens (7-inch 33rpm extended play records featuring seven songs) and helped popularize the manufacture of limited edition records on colored vinyl. one of the most interesting releases was from the band entitled “The Sharks” (later Shark Island). This custom shaped single, executive producer Jeff Willmitt, had 3 outer edge “shark fins” that when inserted into the sleeve appeared to cut through the water. The label was also influential through its release of multi-band compilation albums, such as its "The Sound of Hollywood" series, and promotional label samplers making use of album tracks, typified by its "Mystic Sampler" series.

Additionally, Moody worked to define new genres of music such as "METALCORE," which he described in 1984 Press Release as "a mixture of hardcore, fast paced thrash music with double drumming & heavy Metal screaming guitars."

Moody's key collaborators on the Mystic Records project included producer and engineer Phillip "Philco" Raves, sales and distribution Randy Boyd of Cobraside Distribution, promotion director Mark Wilkins, and Candace D'Andrea who is Chief Operating Officer.

See also
 List of record labels

References

Selected artists

 Agression
 America's Hardcore
 Battalion of Saints
 BLEED
 Bleach Party, USA
 The Conservatives
 Crankshaft
 Doggy Style
 Dr. Know
 Duct Tape Hostage
 Fatal Error
 Fornicators
 First Offense
 The Grim

 Ill Repute
 Insolent
 Killroy
 Manic Subsidiary
 Manifest Destiny
 Meatwagon
 The Mentors
 New Regime
 NOFX
  The P.T.L. Klub
 Rabid Fetus
 Rich Kids on LSD
 RUNOFF

 Sado-Nation
 Scared Straight
 Screaming Bloody Marys 
 SIN 34
 Slaughterhouse 5
 Social Spit
 Stäläg 13
 Suicidal Tendencies
 Teacherz
 The Shades
 Stukas Over Bedrock
 Undercity Kings
 Zoo

External links
 Mystic Records Official Website
Interview with Doug Moody for the NAMM (National Association of Music Merchants) Oral History Program May 2, 2008
 Mystic Records newsletter, 1984

American record labels
Alternative rock record labels
Punk record labels
Oceanside, California